Circumferential Road 2 (C-2), informally known as the C-2 Road, is a network of roads and bridges that all together form the second beltway of Metro Manila in the Philippines.

The entire route is also designated as National Route 140 (N140) of the Philippine highway network.

History 
The development of a major road network in Manila was first conceived in the Metropolitan Thoroughfare Plan of 1945, predicting that the metropolis in the 1940s will expand further to the shorelines of Laguna de Bay. The plan proposed the laying of circumferential roads 1 to 6 and radial roads 1 to 10.

Since roads were already existing, the concept was to just connect short road segments to form C-2. To be joined are Calle Capulong, Calle Tayuman, Governor Forbes, Calle Nagtahan found north of the Pasig River, and Calle Canonigo in the south bank of the Pasig. The Nagtahan Bridge, the widest bridge crossing of the Pasig River until it was surpassed by the Guadalupe Bridge in 1963, connected these two sections.

Older roads dates back to the early 19th century, under the Spanish rule. Calle Canonigo (now Quirino Avenue Extension) was laid out to connect Plaza Dilao and Paco railroad station to Calle Isaac Peral (now United Nations Avenue). The road perpendicular to Canonigo leading to the Pasig River was a narrow street called Calle Luengo in Pandacan.

A 1934 map of Manila by the YMCA shows Calle Tayuman starts at Calle Sande (now Nicolas Zamora Street) and Calle Juan Luna and ends near the San Lazaro Hippodrome. The road then connects to Calle Governor Forbes (now Lacson Avenue) which stretched until Calle Lealtad (now Fajardo). Calle Nagtahan connects the Santa Mesa Rotonda up to the Pasig River. South of the river, only Calle Canonigo was existing. Harrison Boulevard (now Quirino Avenue) was then built during the Commonwealth period to connect Calle Herrán (now Pedro Gil Street) to Dewey Boulevard (now Roxas Boulevard). Eventually, Calle Luengo was extended to Calle Herran.

Route description

Capulong Street 
Also known as the C-2 Road, Capulong Street starts from Mel Lopez Boulevard, a part of Radial Road 10 (R-10), and ends in Juan Luna Street. It is the main thoroughfare of the district of Tondo in Manila.

Tayuman Street 

Tayuman Street is a four-lane main thoroughfare of the districts of Tondo and Santa Cruz. It starts from the Juan Luna Street and ends in a junction with Lacson Avenue. The entire road is considered as a part of the C-2 Road.

Lacson Avenue 

Formerly known as Governor Forbes Avenue, the C-2 segment of Lacson Avenue starts from the junction of Tayuman and Consuelo Streets in Santa Cruz and ends at Nagtahan Interchange, skirting the old San Lazaro Hippodrome.

Nagtahan Street 
Nagtahan Street connects the Nagtahan Interchange with Mabini Bridge (Nagtahan Bridge).

Quirino Avenue 

Quirino Avenue starts at the southern end of Mabini Bridge at the junction of Paz Mendoza Guazon (formerly Otis) and Jesus Streets in Paco and ends at Roxas Boulevard in Malate.

References 

Routes in Metro Manila